CHPR may stand for:

 Cromford and High Peak Railway, a railway line in the United Kingdom,
 CHPR-FM, a Canadian radio station in Hawkesbury, Ontario.
 Center for Healthcare Policy and Research University of California, Davis, Research Center located in Sacramento, CA
 Complementary Health Practice Review